Thomas Albert Witcher (born September 28, 1936) is a former American football linebacker who played one season with the Houston Oilers of the American Football League (AFL). He was drafted by the Los Angeles Rams in the thirteenth round of the 1959 NFL Draft. He was also drafted by the Oakland Raiders in the 1960 AFL Draft. Witcher played college football at Baylor University and attended Lampasas High School in Lampasas, Texas.

Professional career
Witcher was selected by the Los Angeles Rams with the 152nd pick in the 1959 NFL Draft. He was also selected by the Oakland Raiders in the 1960 AFL Draft. He played in fourteen games for the Houston Oilers of the AFL in 1960.

Personal life
Witcher retired from professional football to attend law school. He then became a lawyer in Texas.

References

External links
Just Sports Stats

Living people
1936 births
Players of American football from Texas
American football linebackers
Baylor Bears football players
Houston Oilers players
20th-century American lawyers
Texas lawyers
People from Burnet County, Texas
American Football League players